Germany competed at the 1998 Winter Olympics in Nagano, Japan.

Medalists

Alpine skiing

Men

Women

Women's combined

Biathlon

Men

Men's 4 × 7.5 km relay

Women

Women's 4 × 7.5 km relay

 1 A penalty loop of 150 metres had to be skied per missed target.
 2 One minute added per missed target.

Bobsleigh

Cross-country skiing

Men

 1 Starting delay based on 10 km results. 
 C = Classical style, F = Freestyle

Men's 4 × 10 km relay

Women

 2 Starting delay based on 5 km results. 
 C = Classical style, F = Freestyle

Women's 4 × 5 km relay

Curling

Men's tournament

Group stage
Top four teams advanced to semi-finals.

|}

Contestants

Women's tournament

Group stage
Top four teams advanced to semi-finals.

|}

Contestants

Figure skating

Pairs

Ice Dancing

Freestyle skiing

Women

Ice hockey

Men's tournament

Preliminary round
Top team (shaded) advanced to the first round.

Consolation round

Team roster
Olaf Kölzig
Josef Heiß
Klaus Merk
Mirko Lüdemann
Erich Goldmann
Uwe Krupp
Markus Wieland
Daniel Kunce
Brad Bergen
Jochen Molling
Lars Brüggemann
Peter Draisaitl
Jan Benda
Mark MacKay
Reemt Pyka
Jochen Hecht
Benoît Doucet
Stefan Ustorf
Thomas Brandl
Andreas Lupzig
Dieter Hegen
Jürgen Rumrich
Marco Sturm
Head coach: George Kingston

Luge

Men

(Men's) Doubles

Women

Nordic combined 

Men's individual

Events:
 normal hill ski jumping
 15 km cross-country skiing 

Men's team

Four participants per team.

Events:
 normal hill ski jumping
 5 km cross-country skiing

Short track speed skating

Men

Women

Ski jumping 

Men's team large hill

 1 Four teams members performed two jumps each.

Snowboarding

Men's giant slalom

Men's halfpipe

Women's giant slalom

Women's halfpipe

Speed skating

Men

Women

References
Official Olympic Reports
International Olympic Committee results database
 Olympic Winter Games 1998, full results by sports-reference.com

Nations at the 1998 Winter Olympics
1998
Winter Olympics